Come See About Me was Freda Payne's fifteenth studio album and her first in five years. The album itself is a combination of the musical styles of pop, R&B, and jazz. Primarily a cover album, this album contains only five original songs: "Let's Make Beautiful Music", "First Impression", "I Live for New York City", "You Complete Me", and "Just Like That" (the last of which is a duet with the Temptations' Ali-Ollie Woodson). Inside the album cover is an essay written by Lee Hildebrand in December 2000 that discusses Payne's life and career and personal comments by Payne herself.

Track listing

 "Just Like That" is a duet with Ali-Ollie Woodson with Preston Glass and Karen Newman on background vocals.

Personnel
Freda Payne – lead vocals
Mic Gillette – trumpet, trombone
George Brooks – saxophones
Ray Obeido – guitars
Preston Glass – keyboards, sitar, electric guitar, drum and synthesizer programming
Steve Fontano – keyboards, programming whistle
Troy Luccketta – drums
Roberta Freeman, Angel Sessions, Preston Glass – background vocals

Production
Arrangements by Preston Glass except track 3 by Steve Fontano
Produced by F.L. Pittman and Preston Glass (track 3 co-produced by Steve Fontano) except track 11 produced by F.L. Pittman and Felton Pilate
Executive producer: Phil Jones
Recording and mixing engineer: Steve Fontano
Additional engineering: Stephen Hart
Mastering: George Horn (Fantasy)
Art direction, design: Jamie Putnam
Photography: Steve Maruta
Wardrobe and jewelry: L.S.O. Designs
Recorded (Fall 2000) at Fantasy Studios, Berkeley

References

External links 
 Freda Payne - Come See About Me (2001) album review by Alex Henderson, credits & releases at AllMusic
 Freda Payne - Come See About Me (2001) album releases & credits at Discogs

2001 albums
Freda Payne albums